The BLH S12 was a  diesel-electric locomotive intended for use in yard switching. Utilizing a turbocharged 6-cylinder version of the powerful 606A diesel prime mover, S12s were known for their "lugging" power, despite being temperamental. Like most BLH switchers, the S12 had AAR Type-A switcher trucks in a B-B wheel arrangement. 451 units were built between 1951 and 1956, when BLH left the locomotive market.

Previous models 
Baldwin made a number of switchers with similar dimensions and body styles. The first body style, used in VO models, had a slightly pointed nose with a round radiator opening. The second and third body style, almost indistinguishable and used interchangeably, had a flat nose and rectangular radiator opening. Various exhaust stacks were used, and are not an effective spotting feature, except that turbocharged models always had one large stack offset to the side.

The VO-660 was built between April 1939 and May 1946. Baldwin replaced the VO-660 with the model DS-4-4-660 in 1946.

The VO-1000 was built between January 1939 and December 1946. Some had the Batz truck originally developed by the Atchison, Topeka and Santa Fe Railway as a leading truck for steam locomotives. 548 VO-1000s were built.

The DS-4-4-660 was built between 1946 and 1949. It replaced the  VO-660 as the low power companion to the DS-4-4-1000 models. 139 were built.

The DS-4-4-1000 was a  model built between 1946 and 1951. The first units (56 locomotives) were powered by an 8-cylinder normally aspirated prime mover, but from 1948 a change was made to a 6-cylinder turbocharged engine. A total of 502 were built.

Original buyers

Surviving units 
At least six intact examples of the S12 are known to survive at railroad museums. SMS Lines operates S12 #301 at the Penn Warner industrial park at Morrisville, Pennsylvania. One unit that was converted from a Baldwin DS-4-4-1000 is in service on the Whitewater Valley Railroad.

References

External links

 Baldwin S-12
 Preserved Baldwin and Lima locomotives

B-B locomotives
S-12
Diesel-electric locomotives of the United States
Railway locomotives introduced in 1951
Standard gauge locomotives of the United States
Shunting locomotives